Schlaiten is a municipality in the district of Lienz in the Austrian state of Tyrol. Its name is of Slavonic origin, deriving from *slatina, which means swamp. The municipality consists of the following neighbourhoods: Plone, Gonzach, Mesnerdorf, Bacherdorf, Gantschach and Göriach.

Population

References

Cities and towns in Lienz District